Kishō, Kisho or Kishou (written: 紀章 or 貴章) is a masculine Japanese given name. Notable people with the name include:

, Japanese baseball player
, Japanese architect
, Japanese voice actor
, Japanese footballer

Japanese masculine given names